Dawyck Botanic Garden is a botanic garden and arboretum covering  at Stobo on the B712,  south of Peebles in the Scottish Borders region of Scotland, OS ref. NT168352. The garden is situated in the Upper Tweed Valley, a National Scenic Area.

Dawyck, with Logan Botanic Garden (near Stranraer) and Benmore Botanic Garden (near Dunoon), is an outpost or Regional Garden of the Royal Botanic Garden Edinburgh (RBGE).

History

The name is also given as 'Dawic', and 'Dauwic' in circa 1200. It may derive from the Gaelic for an ox and the Old English 'wic' for a camp or dwelling.

The Veitch family planted the garden at Dawyck House in the 17th century until the Naesmith family took over in 1691. Sir John Murray Naesmith supported plant-hunting expeditions, especially those undertaken by the explorer and plant hunter David Douglas (1799–1834). In 1897 the Balfour family acquired the Dawyck Estate, and in 1978 they gave the Garden to the Royal Botanic Garden, with the exception of Dawyck House and chapel which remain in private use.

The private Dawyck Chapel, built in 1837, sits on the site of the ancient Dalwick Chapel within the gardens.

Views within the Botanic Gardens

Heritage Trees of Scotland
Of the eleven "Heritage Trees of Scotland" in the Scottish Borders, three are at Dawyck.
The Dawyck Silver Fir is 35 m (115 ft) in height, the trunk measures 172 cm (5 ft 7 in), and its girth is 5.4 m (17 ft 9 in). There are also the Dawyck Larch, planted 1725, girth 4.46 m height 33 m; and the Dawyck Beech, planted 1860, has an unusual form with upswept branches. See link below to Forestry commission.

See also

Dawyck Chapel
List of places in the Scottish Borders
Royal Botanic Garden Edinburgh
The Dawyck Gateway Visitor Centre was nominated for the RIAS Andrew Doolan Award for Architecture in 2008.

References

Notes

Sources
Johnston, J. B. (1903). Place-names of Scotland. Edinburgh : David Douglas.

External links

Royal Botanic Garden Edinburgh: Dawyck Botanic Garden webpage
PDF Map of Dawyck Botanic Garden
ArchitectureScotland.uk: "Construction of Dawyck's visitor centre"
Botanic Gardens Conservation International (BGCI) report on environmental sustainability features of Dawyck' visitor centre
Gazetteer for Scotland: Dawyck Botanic Garden
Forestry Commission's "Heritage Trees of Scotland": Dawyck silver fir

Botanical gardens in Scotland
Gardens in the Scottish Borders
Inventory of Gardens and Designed Landscapes
Royal Botanic Garden Edinburgh